The Rolling Hotel (German:Das rollende Hotel) is a 1918 German silent film directed by Harry Piel. It is one of a number of films featuring the detective character Joe Deebs.

Cast
 Heinrich Schroth as Joe Deebs  
 Käthe Haack 
 Wilhelm Diegelmann
 Stefan Vacano

References

Bibliography
 Hans-Michael Bock & Claudia Lenssen. Joe May: Regisseur und Produzent. 1991.

External links

1918 films
Films of the German Empire
Films directed by Harry Piel
German silent feature films
UFA GmbH films
German black-and-white films
1910s German films